Hemidactylus kyaboboensis is a species of forest geckos from Ghana and Togo. Its type locality is Kyabobo National Park, to which its specific name refers. It is the sister species of Hemidactylus fasciatus.

Description
The head is broad. The body has indistinct dark crossbands and more prominent whitish stripes and dots. There is a broad crossband on the neck that reaches the lower tip of the ear hole.

Habitat and distribution
Hemidactylus kyaboboensis have been collected from moist, semi-deciduous rainforests in the Togo Hills of eastern Ghana and Missahöhe in western Togo. These rainforests are habitat islands within the more arid Dahomey Gap.

References

Further reading

External links

Hemidactylus
Geckos of Africa
Reptiles of West Africa
Fauna of Ghana
Fauna of Togo
Reptiles described in 2014
Taxa named by Philipp Wagner